E95 may refer to:
 King's Indian Defense, Encyclopaedia of Chess Openings code
 An ethanol fuel mixture used in modified diesel engines. The fuel's commercial name is ED95
 The FAA location identifier for Benson Municipal Airport (Arizona).
 European route E95, a road connecting St Petersburg in Russia and Merzifon in Turkey passing through Belarus and Ukraine
 Bantan Renraku Road, route E95 in Japan.